South Davidson High is located near Denton, North Carolina. It adjoins South Davidson Middle School.

History
South Davidson High School was originally Denton High School, which was opened in 1929 as part of a plan to bring a public high school to southern Davidson County. In 1989 the building became Denton Elementary School and the high school moved to its present larger building one mile north of Denton and was renamed South Davidson High School.  When the new high school opened, Silver Valley Elementary, which had been a feeder school for nearby Central Davidson High School, became an additional feeder school for South. In 2009, a new wing was opened, including a new band room, new administrative offices, and eight new classrooms.

In August 2019, the school made news when a student spray-painted a racist violent phrase on the campus's Spirit Rock, leading to an administrative feud between the Lexington City Schools and Davidson County Schools districts, which was expressed as a football boycott.

Athletics
SDHS athletic teams are the Wildcats. The school is a part of the 1A/2A Central Carolina Conference.

The sport teams of South are:
Baseball
Basketball
Cross country
Football
Golf
Soccer
Softball
Tennis
Track and field
Wrestling

References

External links
 South Davidson High School - Home

Schools in Davidson County, North Carolina
Public high schools in North Carolina